Keanin Ayer Boya (born 21 April 2000) is a South African soccer player currently playing as a midfielder for Sandefjord.

Career statistics

Notes

References

2000 births
Living people
South African soccer players
South African expatriate soccer players
Association football midfielders
Superettan players
Allsvenskan players
Right to Dream Academy players
Varbergs BoIS players
South African expatriate sportspeople in Sweden
Expatriate footballers in Ghana
Expatriate footballers in Sweden
Sportspeople from Johannesburg